Oral administration is a route of administration where a substance is taken through the mouth. Per os abbreviated to P.O. is sometimes used as a direction for medication to be taken orally. Many medications are taken orally because they are intended to have a systemic effect, reaching different parts of the body via the bloodstream, for example.

Oral administration can be easier and less painful than other routes, such as injection. However, the onset of action is relatively low, and the effectiveness is reduced if it is not absorbed properly in the digestive system, or if it is broken down by digestive enzymes before it can reach the bloodstream. Some medications may cause gastrointestinal side effects, such as nausea or vomiting, when taken orally. Oral administration can also only be applied to conscious patients, and patients able to swallow.

Terminology
Per os (P.O.) is an adverbial phrase meaning literally from Latin "through the mouth" or "by mouth". The expression is used in medicine to describe a treatment that is taken orally (but not used in the mouth such as, for example, caries prophylaxis). The abbreviation P.O. is often used on medical prescriptions.

Scope
Oral administration includes:
 Buccal, dissolved inside the cheek
 Sublabial, dissolved under the lip
 Sublingual administration (SL), dissolved under the tongue, but due to rapid absorption many consider SL a parenteral route

Enteral medications come in various forms, including oral solid dosage (OSD) forms:

 Tablets to swallow, chew or dissolve in water or under the tongue
 Capsules and chewable capsules (with a coating that dissolves in the stomach or bowel to release the medication there)
 Time-release or sustained-release tablets and capsules (which release the medication gradually)
 Powders or granules

and oral liquid dosage forms:

 Teas
 Drops
 Liquid medications or syrups

Facilitating methods
Concomitant ingestion of water facilitates in swallowing tablets and capsules. If the substance has disagreeable taste, addition of a flavor may facilitate ingestion. Substances that are harmful to the teeth are preferably given through a straw.

See also
Nothing by mouth
List of abbreviations used in medical prescriptions
List of Latin phrases
Medical prescription
Thin-film drug delivery

References

Medical terminology
Routes of administration